Bit.Trip Saga (stylized as BIT.TRIP SAGA) is a music video game developed by Gaijin Games and published by Aksys Games for the Nintendo 3DS. It was released on September 13, 2011 in North America and in the PAL region by Rising Star Games on March 16, 2012. It is a compilation of the six downloadable video games released for the Nintendo Wii's WiiWare service, including Bit.Trip Beat, Bit.Trip Core, Bit.Trip Void, Bit.Trip Runner, Bit.Trip Fate, and Bit.Trip Flux.

Gameplay
All six of the Bit.Trip titles support the Nintendo 3DS' stereoscopic 3D visual effects. All of the games feature "simple graphics" and "challenging gameplay tied to a soundtrack of Atari 2600-like bleeps".

Development
Bit.Trip Saga was announced on April 28, 2011 in a press release by Aksys Games, its publisher. Gaijin Games, along with Aksys, was responsible for the creation of all the Bit.Trip titles included in this collection, which included Bit.Trip Beat, Bit.Trip Core, Bit.Trip Void, Bit.Trip Runner, Bit.Trip Fate, and Bit.Trip Flux.

Reception

Pre-release
The release of all six Bit.Trip games in one collection garnered excitement from journalists. Kotakus Michael McWhertor wrote that its numerous features would make it "worth the cost/wait". GameZone's David Sanchez wrote that "Bit.Trip Saga will be a worthwhile purchase for indie gamers and fans of all-around awesome games".

Critical

The game received "generally favorable reviews" according to the review aggregation website Metacritic.

References

External links
 

2011 video games
Music video games
Nintendo 3DS games
Nintendo 3DS eShop games
Nintendo 3DS-only games
Video game compilations
Choice Provisions games
Video games developed in the United States
Single-player video games
Rising Star Games games